An oval is a curve resembling an egg or an ellipse.

Oval, The Oval, or variations may also refer to:

Mathematics
Cassini oval
Oval (projective plane)

Places

Singapore
The Oval, Singapore, a road within Seletar Aerospace Park off Seletar Aerospace Drive

United Kingdom
Oval, London, a district in South London

United States
Oval, North Carolina, an unincorporated community
Oval, Pennsylvania, a census-designated place
Oval City, Ohio, an unincorporated community
Oval Park, Visalia, California, a neighborhood

Sports

Cricket
Adelaide Oval, in Australia
Cricket oval, a type of sporting ground
Kensington Oval, in Barbados
Kensington Oval, Dunedin, a cricket ground in New Zealand
The Oval, in London
The Oval (Llandudno), a cricket ground in Llandudno, Conwy, Wales
University of Otago Oval, a cricket ground in New Zealand

Football
Australian rules football playing field
Perth Oval, in Australia
The Oval (Belfast), in Northern Ireland
The Oval (Eastbourne), in England
The Oval (Wednesbury) (defunct), in England

Ice skating
Guidant John Rose Minnesota Oval, a multi-use ice facility in Minnesota, United States
Olympic Oval, a speed skating rink in Calgary, Alberta, Canada
Speed skating rink
Utah Olympic Oval, a speed skating rink in Salt Lake City, Utah, United States

Other uses in sports
The Oval (Prestwick), a public park and sports facility in Scotland
The Oval (Caernarfon), a multi-use stadium in Caernarfon, Wales
The Oval (Wirral), an athletics stadium in Bebington, Merseyside, England
Oval track, in automobile racing

Other
Old Oval, also known as the Kenneth A. Shaw Quadrangle since 2010, a central lawn on the Syracuse University campus
Open Vulnerability and Assessment Language, in computing
Oval (musical project), German electronic music project
Oval (Stanford University), an oval-shaped sunken lawn on the Stanford University campus, Stanford, California, United States
Oval Office, the official office of the President of the United States
Oval tube station, situated near the Oval cricket ground in London, England
The Oval (Limassol), a commercial use high-rise building in Limassol, Cyprus
The Oval (Ohio State University), a large green area in the center of the university
The Oval (TV series), a 2019 TV series on BET created by Tyler Perry

See also
Ellipse (disambiguation)